Lone Frank (born Lone Frank Pedersen 1966 in Århus) is a  Danish science journalist, author and PhD in neurobiology. Since 1998 she has written for newspapers. She is also a commentator and lecturer and has worked in radio and television; including organized and participated in science series on television, talking about controversial issues such as heritability of IQ and race and intelligence. She received her master's degree in biology on a thesis about "the transcriptional regulation of glutamate receptors in cerebral ischemia" from Aarhus University in 1992.

In September 2011 her book, My Beautiful Genome: Exposing Our Genetic Future, One Quirk at a Time was released to positive reviews. The book is based on a number of genetic-based tests, which aims to clarify the biological context of human personal development. It was also released in German, Norwegian and Dutch.

Bibliography
Mindfield: How Brain Science is Changing Our World, 2009, Oneworld Publications, 
My Beautiful Genome: Discovering Our Genetic Future, One Quirk at a Time, 2011, Oneworld Publications, 
The Pleasure Shock: The Rise of Deep Brain Stimulation and Its Forgotten Inventor, 2018, Penguin Publishing Group

External links 
 lonefrank.dk – Personal website

References

1966 births
Living people
Aarhus University alumni
Danish women journalists
Science journalists
Danish science writers
Danish women scientists
People from Aarhus
20th-century Danish scientists
20th-century Danish writers
21st-century Danish scientists
21st-century Danish writers
Weekendavisen people
20th-century Danish women writers
21st-century Danish women writers